"Never Let You Go" is a song by British drum and bass band Rudimental, featuring Foy Vance, released on 4 June 2015 as the second single from the group's second studio album, We the Generation (2015). The track premiered on 27 April 2015 as BBC Radio 1 DJ Annie Mac's Hottest Record in the World.

Music video
A music video was produced for the song which features the band as well as shots of Ukraine, Los Angeles, Morocco and the band's native United Kingdom.

Track listings

Live performances

Charts

Release history

References

2015 singles
2015 songs
Rudimental songs
Asylum Records singles
Foy Vance songs
Music videos shot in Ukraine
Song recordings produced by Rudimental
Songs written by Amir Amor
Songs written by Foy Vance
Songs written by Johnny McDaid